N. M. Bodecker (January 13, 1922 - February 1, 1988)) was an author and illustrator of children's books. Bodecker won the Christopher Award for poetry in 1974 and 1976. He is probably best remembered for illustrating Edward Eager's book series Tales of Magic, but he also illustrated works by Charles Dickens and periodicals including Harper’s Magazine, The Saturday Evening Post, and the New York Times. His original drawings for children’s book are housed by the Kerlan Collection at the University of Minnesota.

Biography
Bodecker was born on January 13, 1922, in Copenhagen, Denmark. After World War II, he emigrated to America. In 1972, he moved to Hancock, New Hampshire, where he lived for the remainder of his life.

He had three sons.

He died on February 1, 1988, at the age of 66 of colon cancer.

Name
The N. M. stood for Niels Mogens but, when asked, Bodecker would say "Nothing Much" or "Never Mind."

Foundation
The N. M. Bodecker Foundation was established 2017 by Bodecker's son Sandy, a vice-president of Nike to "empower creative youth to imagine and achieve their artistic, educational, and professional dreams." Graduate programs began in 2020.

References

1922 births
1988 deaths
Writers from Copenhagen
Writers from New Hampshire
20th-century Danish illustrators
Danish children's writers
Danish emigrants to the United States
American illustrators
American children's writers
Deaths from colorectal cancer
Deaths from cancer in New Hampshire